David or Dave Gray may refer to:

Sportspeople
David Gray (cricketer) (1922–2003), English cricketer
David Gray (footballer, born 1922) (1922–2008), Scottish footballer (mostly played for Preston NE and Blackburn)
David Gray (footballer, born 1923) (1923–1985), Scottish footballer (mostly played for Bradford)
David Gray (footballer, born 1988), Scottish footballer
David Gray (rugby union) (1953–2009), Scotland international rugby union player
David Gray (snooker player) (born 1979), English professional snooker player
Dave Gray (1943–2020), Major League Baseball pitcher

Others
 David Gray (Australian musician), Australian singer-songwriter
 David Gray (Australian politician) (born 1956), member of the Victorian Legislative Assembly
 David Gray (diplomat) (1870–1968), American minister to Ireland during World War II
 David Gray (director), American commercial director and former creative director
 David Gray (murderer), perpetrator of the Aramoana massacre
 David Gray (musician) (born 1968), English singer-songwriter
 David Gray (poet) (1838–1861), Scottish poet
 David Gray (police officer) (1914–1999), Scottish police officer
 David Frank Gray (born 1938), Canadian astronomer and stellar spectroscopist
 Ugly Dave Gray (born 1933), Australian television personality
 David Gray, drummer for the British blackened death metal band Akercocke
 David Gray, animator on Humf, a British children's television program
David Gray (General Hospital), a character in the soap opera General Hospital

See also
David Grey, American poker player